Southern Powered Parachutes was an American aircraft manufacturer based in Nicholson, Georgia. The company specialized in the design and manufacture of powered parachutes in the form of ready-to-fly aircraft for the European Fédération Aéronautique Internationale microlight and the US FAR 103 Ultralight Vehicles trainer rules. The company's designs were never listed in the American light-sport aircraft category.

The company was founded as  Condor Powered Parachutes by John Massey in about 2001 as a result of his experience as a powered parachute pilot and dealer for other brands. He wanted to produce a lower-cost aircraft and Massey had a chance meeting with the president of Aerostar that led to a manufacturing relationship. As the model line expanded the company changed its name to Southern Powered Parachutes.

Southern produced two models, the Condor and Raptor, with the airframes built by Aerostar in Romania. The airframes were shipped to the US and assembled in Georgia for domestic sale. At least 15 Condors and eight Raptors were built. The company seems to have gone out of business in about 2006.

Aircraft

References

External links
Company website archives on Archive.org

Defunct aircraft manufacturers of the United States
Ultralight aircraft
Powered parachutes